Charles Clay (born February 13, 1989) is an American football tight end who is a free agent. He played college football at Tulsa and was drafted by the Miami Dolphins in the sixth round (174th overall) of the 2011 NFL Draft. He has also played for the Buffalo Bills and Arizona Cardinals.

Clay began his career as a fullback and often lined up in the backfield as an H-back.

Early years
Clay attended Little Rock Central High School where he was ranked as the 13th top overall prospect in the state of Arkansas by Rivals.com his senior season. As a senior, he rushed for 891 yards and 11 touchdowns, he also had four receiving touchdowns. He was rated a three-star recruit by Rivals.com.

College career
After high school, Clay attended the University of Tulsa, where he majored in business as well as played halfback and fullback from 2007 to 2010. As a true freshman in 2007, he appeared in all 14 games (10 starts). He recorded 69 receptions for 1,024 yards and seven touchdowns. His receiving yards ranked him second on the school's all-time freshman receiving list. He also recorded 304 rushing yards and one touchdown. He was named to the C-USA All-Freshman team as well as All-C-USA honorable mention. He was also named Second-team Freshman All-American by Rivals.com as an All-purpose player. As a sophomore in 2008, he appeared in all 14 games (nine starts). He recorded 38 receptions for 464 yards and nine touchdowns. He also carried the ball 25 times for 145 yards and two touchdowns. In 2009, as a junior, he appeared in all 12 games (11 starts). He recorded 39 receptions for 530 yards and five touchdowns. He also rushed the ball 63 times for 236 yards and seven touchdowns. As a senior in 2010, he appeared in 13 games. He recorded 43 receptions for 526 yards and seven touchdowns. He also, rushed the ball 34 times for 226 yards.

During his career Clay accumulated 685 rushing yards on 145 carries with 10 rushing touchdowns and also added over 2,000 yards receiving with 21 receiving touchdowns.

College statistics

Professional career

Pre-draft

After playing in the 2011 Senior Bowl and participating in the NFL Scouting Combine, NFL.com's scouts noted that "Clay is an athletic fullback that is a weapon in the receiving game. Possesses good lateral agility and makes people miss in the open field. Delivers powerful shots blocking and shows good leg drive. Strong enough to push the pile in short yardage situations and can break tackles in the secondary."

Miami Dolphins
Clay was drafted in the sixth round (174th overall) of the 2011 NFL Draft by the Miami Dolphins. He signed his 4-year rookie deal on July 29.

Clay recorded his first career reception on October 2, 2011, against the San Diego Chargers. On November 20, he recorded his first touchdown against the Buffalo Bills. He finished the 2011 seasons with 16 receptions for 233 yards (14.6 avg.) and three touchdowns and the 2012 season with 18 receptions for 212 yards (11.8 avg.) and two touchdowns as one of the team's fullbacks.

In 2013, after starting tight end Dustin Keller suffered a season-ending knee injury in the preseason, Clay assumed the starting tight end role after being an H-Back on the team. In his second start, he recorded his first career rushing touchdown and 109 yards receiving in a Week 2 matchup with the Colts. During Week 14, against the Pittsburgh Steelers he broke multiple tackles, including one of veteran safety Troy Polamalu, on his way to a touchdown in a Miami win. He finished the season with 69 catches (7th among tight ends), 759 yards (tied for 9th), 11.0 avg. and six touchdowns; in addition to 15 yards rushing on seven carries and a rushing touchdown. His performance earned him the 89th ranking position on the 2014 edition of the NFL Top 100.

In the 2014 season, he started all 14 games he appeared in, missing games 11 and 12 due to injury. In week 16, he had a career best 114 yards on six catches in a win over Minnesota. On the season, he recorded 58 receptions for 605 yards (10.4 avg.) and three touchdowns.

Buffalo Bills

On March 19, 2015, Clay signed a five-year, $38 million contract with the Buffalo Bills, after the Dolphins elected not to match the offer.

In 2015, his first season in Buffalo, he started 13 games. He had a career best nine catches in game 4 against the Giants, and matched it two weeks later against the Bengals, both losses. He recorded 51 receptions for 528 yards (10.4 avg.) and three touchdowns.

He played all 16 games in 2016, but reached 50 yards receiving in only five of them. All four of his touchdowns came in games 13 to 15.

On September 10, 2017, Clay caught four passes for 53 yards and a touchdown in the season opener against the New York Jets. He played a pivotal role in a 23-17 week 4 victory over undefeated Atlanta with 112 yards.

In 2018, Clay had 21 receptions for a career-low 184 yards and no touchdowns.

On February 15, 2019, Clay was released by the Bills.

Buffalo Bills franchise records
First Bills tight end with back-to-back seasons with 50+ receptions, 500+ receiving yards 
Most consecutive games with 1+ receiving TD by a Bills tight end: 3, tied with Scott Chandler

Arizona Cardinals
On February 19, 2019, Clay signed with the Arizona Cardinals on a one-year contract worth up to $3.25 million with a $350K signing bonus.

On June 11, 2021, the Baltimore Ravens hosted Clay for a workout.

NFL career statistics

Personal life
Clay is the son of Charles and Jerrilyn Clay. He was a member of the Fellowship of Christian Athletes. The elder Clay played college football at Arkansas.

References

External links
 
 
 
 Miami Dolphins bio
 Buffalo Bills bio

1989 births
Living people
Sportspeople from Little Rock, Arkansas
Players of American football from Arkansas
African-American players of American football
American football tight ends
American football fullbacks
Tulsa Golden Hurricane football players
Miami Dolphins players
Buffalo Bills players
Arizona Cardinals players
21st-century African-American sportspeople
20th-century African-American people